The Museum of Sex, also known as MoSex, is a sex museum located at 233 Fifth Avenue at the corner of East 27th Street in Manhattan, New York City. It opened on October 5, 2002.

History
Founder Daniel Gluck wanted to start a museum dedicated to "the history, evolution and cultural significance of human sexuality." The official mission of the Museum of Sex is "to preserve and present the history, evolution, and cultural significance of human sexuality. In its exhibitions, programs and publications, The Museum of Sex is committed to open discourse and exchange, and to bringing to the public the best in current scholarship." The museum focuses on a variety of sexual preferences and subcultures, including lesbian and gay history and erotica, BDSM, pornography, and sex work. Although the museum's exhibits are presented in an educational format, they sometimes feature explicit content. Because of this, visitors must be 18 years old or older.

While Gluck was planning the museum, the New York State Board of Regents rejected its application for non-profit status, objecting that the idea of a "museum of sex" made "a mockery" of the concept of museums. Because of this, and because Gluck opted not to accept funding from the pornography industry, the admission fee was initially $17.

Unlike restrictions placed on adult entertainment venues, New York City authorities have allowed the museum to locate itself within 500 feet of a church or school. Before the Museum opened to the public, William Donohue of the Catholic League for Religious and Civil Rights called it a "museum of smut", writing "If the museum's officials were honest, they would include a death chamber that would acknowledge all the wretched diseases that promiscuity has caused. And they would give due recognition to the role that promiscuity has played in creating poverty. But instead we can look for the museum to celebrate public sex." However, since it opened in 2002, the Museum has faced no opposition from religious officials and even hosted an event entitled "Faith in Latex" which brought together leaders from the Catholic, Pentecostal, Episcopalian, Buddhist, and Jewish faiths.  

The inaugural exhibit, NYC Sex: How New York City Transformed Sex in America, focused on the museum's home city, but later exhibits focused on sexuality in other cultures and time periods. Other exhibitions have included Sex Among the Lotus: 2500 Years of Chinese Erotic Obsession; GET OFF: Exploring the Pleasure Principles; Vamps & Virgins: The Evolution of American Pinup Photography 1860-1960; Men Without Suits: Objectifying the American Male Body; and an online exhibition US Patent Office Sex Inventions. 

In 2009, the Museum began an expansion project moving its entrance from 27th Street to Fifth Avenue. The Museum also doubled the square footage of their store and increased the size of the museum by one floor, as well as adding another gallery. They expanded even further with an aphrodisiac-themed cafe and additional gallery space.

See also
Madison Square
NoMad
Rose Hill

References

Bibliography
Blementhal, Ralph. "Sex Museum Says It Is Here to Educate" New York Times (September 19, 2002)
Chancellor, Alexander. "The opposite of sex" The Guardian (September 27, 2002)
Steinberg, David. "New York's Thoughtful Museum of Sex" The Spectator (October 18, 2002)

External links
Museum of Sex

Museums established in 2002
Museums in Manhattan
Sex museums in the United States
History museums in New York City
Museum of Sex
Museum of Sex
Museum of Sex